Șipote is a commune in Iași County, Western Moldavia, Romania. It is composed of six villages: Chișcăreni, Hălceni, Iazu Nou, Iazu Vechi, Mitoc and Șipote.

References

Communes in Iași County
Localities in Western Moldavia